Till the Wheels Come Off is the debut studio album by Canadian country music group Cold Creek County. It was released on October 16, 2015, via Sony Music Canada. It includes the singles "Our Town" and "Till the Wheels Come Off".

Track listing

Chart performance

Album

Singles

References

2015 debut albums
Cold Creek County albums
Sony Music Canada albums